Dimitri Lazarov (born June 18, 1946) is a former Bulgarian ice hockey player. He played for the Bulgaria men's national ice hockey team at the 1976 Winter Olympics in Innsbruck.

References

1946 births
Living people
Ice hockey players at the 1976 Winter Olympics
Olympic ice hockey players of Bulgaria